Ella Stuart Carson (born Cora Ella Carson) was an American screenwriter active during Hollywood's early silent days.

Biography 
Ella was born in Hebron, Indiana, to James Carson and Mary Jane Stuart. She attended the Indiana University intent on becoming a teacher, but afterward, she embarked on a career as a newspaperwoman, working at The Chicago Tribune and The Albuquerque Journal. By the mid-1910s, she and her husband, R. Cecil Smith, got work writing scripts at Thomas H. Ince's studio. The pair—who reportedly wrote over 100 screenplays together—filed a trademark in 1920 to have the rest of their screenplays jointly credited to "the R. Cecil Smiths."

Filmography 

Gilded Lies (1921)
The Fighter (1921)
Worlds Apart (1921)
Broadway and Home (1920)
A Fool and His Money (1920)
What's Your Husband Doing? (1920)
 The Law of Men (1919)
 The Law of the North (1918)
 Green Eyes (1918)
 The Claws of the Hun (1918)
 His Mother's Boy (1917)
 Love Letters (1917)
 The Price Mark (1917)

References

External links

American women screenwriters
Screenwriters from Indiana
1880 births
Year of death missing